Gustaf Vilhelm Klarén (30 March 1906 – 27 September 1984) was a Swedish freestyle wrestler who won a bronze medal in the lightweight division at the 1932 Summer Olympics. He initially could not afford traveling to the Olympics, but the inhabitants of Borås helped him by raising money. He later owned and ran a cigar store in Borås.

References

External links
 

1906 births
1984 deaths
Olympic wrestlers of Sweden
Wrestlers at the 1932 Summer Olympics
Swedish male sport wrestlers
Olympic bronze medalists for Sweden
Olympic medalists in wrestling
Medalists at the 1932 Summer Olympics
People from Mark Municipality
Sportspeople from Västra Götaland County
20th-century Swedish people